Michelle Hollis Dusserre (born December 26, 1968) is a former gymnast. She competed for the United States national team at the 1984 Summer Olympics and won a silver medal in the team competition. She was born in Long Beach, California.

References

1968 births
Living people
American female artistic gymnasts
Gymnasts at the 1984 Summer Olympics
Sportspeople from Long Beach, California
Olympic silver medalists for the United States in gymnastics
Medalists at the 1984 Summer Olympics
U.S. women's national team gymnasts
21st-century American women